Bao Yingying (born 6 November 1983 in Qidong, Nantong, Jiangsu) is a female Chinese sabre fencer, who competed at the 2008 Summer Olympics.

Major performances

2001 World University Games - 3rd saber individual;
2002 World Junior Championships - 1st saber individual;
2002 Asian Games - 1st saber team;
2002 World Team Cup Germany - 1st saber team;
2003 World University Games - 1st saber team;
2003 World Championships - 2nd saber team;
2007 Asian Championships - 2nd saber individual

See also
 China at the 2008 Summer Olympics

References

1983 births
Living people
Chinese female fencers
Fencers at the 2008 Summer Olympics
Olympic fencers of China
Olympic silver medalists for China
People from Qidong, Jiangsu
Olympic medalists in fencing
Fencers from Jiangsu
Medalists at the 2008 Summer Olympics
Asian Games medalists in fencing
Fencers at the 2002 Asian Games
Fencers at the 2010 Asian Games
Asian Games gold medalists for China
Medalists at the 2002 Asian Games
Medalists at the 2010 Asian Games
Universiade medalists in fencing
Universiade bronze medalists for China
Sportspeople from Nantong
Medalists at the 2001 Summer Universiade
Medalists at the 2003 Summer Universiade
Medalists at the 2009 Summer Universiade
21st-century Chinese women